Skyfox is a combat flight simulation game developed by Ray Tobey for the Apple II and published by Electronic Arts in 1984. Ariolasoft published the game in Europe. It was released for the ZX Spectrum, Amstrad CPC, Commodore 64, and Macintosh in 1985, to the Amiga and Atari ST in 1986, and to the PC-88 in 1988.

The 1987 sequel, Skyfox II: The Cygnus Conflict, was developed for the Commodore 64 by Dynamix without Tobey's involvement.

Description

The player pilots the Skyfox, the most advanced attack fighter plane available to the fictional government, the Federation. The plane has armaments consisting of radar guided missiles, heat-seeking missiles, laser cannons and deflection shields, and has a top speed of Mach 4. Gameplay consists of finding and destroying enemy tanks, planes and motherships. The game has 15 scenarios that can be played at five skill levels.

Featuring a view from the cockpit of the jet, this game is recognized as popularizing this view. The cockpit features radar which shows incoming missiles and other threats.  Flying above the clouds, the player fights hordes of enemy planes. Flying below them, the player is attacked by enemy tanks. Hailed upon its release, most criticisms of the game cited repetitive gameplay as the only drawback.

Tobey thought a player could get bored flying an advanced fighter plane and might want to play a game.  Consequently, he incorporated a Space Invaders game into Skyfox as a hidden Easter egg activated by pressing Ctrl-G while flying.

The Apple II version can use a Mockingboard, if one is present, for greatly improved audio.

Reception
Skyfox was Electronic Arts' best-selling Commodore 64 game as of late 1987. Its sales had surpassed 250,000 copies by November 1989.

Info rated Skyfox for the Commodore 64 three-plus stars out of five, praising the graphics but stating that "the gamester finds a much less involving product lying below the surface glitz ... Good run for a few hours". Compute! called the Amiga version a game that required "both forethought and quick reflexes ... one of the best available for the Amiga". It concluded that "the designers and programmers have outdone themselves in exploiting the Amiga's powerful features ... a simulation which rivals the best computer games available in any medium". In a 1994 survey of wargames Computer Gaming World gave the title one-plus stars out of five.

References

External links
 
 Skyfox at Lemon Amiga
 Skyfox at Atari Mania
 
 Box, manual, screenshots

1984 video games
Amiga games
Amstrad CPC games
Apple II games
Ariolasoft games
Atari ST games
Cancelled Atari 7800 games
Commodore 64 games
Classic Mac OS games
NEC PC-8801 games
ZX Spectrum games
Electronic Arts games
Combat flight simulators
Dynamix games
Single-player video games
Video games developed in the United States